Founded in 1999, YCD Multimedia provides consulting and applications within the retail environment, as well as other industries, including Quick Service Restaurants (QSR), banking, transportation, hospitality, entertainment, and education, among others.

YCD Multimedia is headquartered in the United States with offices in the United Kingdom and Israel, and has an international network of resellers. In October 2011, YCD acquired C-nario, a global provider of digital signage software solutions.

YCD partners with industry leaders such as Intel, HP, IBM, Microsoft, Philips  and Matrox, and has over 2,000 customers in 40 countries, including Coca-Cola, Toyota, Estée Lauder and many others.

History 
YCD Multimedia was established in 1999 in Israel by Noam Levavi and Dani Zeevi, and developed as one of the first software-based music systems for bars and restaurants. Between 2002-2005, YCD developed its multimedia platform (YCD|Platform), and  the YCD|Player with digital video capability. By the end of 2005 YCD had already 1,000 installations internationally. In 2006, YCD opened its UK and US offices.

In 2007, YCD moved its headquarters to NY and launched YCD|AdScreen® - special displays at point of sale for targeted promotions.

In 2008, YCD equipped Ferrari stores in Florida and Hawaii with digital media solutions. New Look, a UK fashion retailer, selected YCD Multimedia's  solutions for its new flagship store in Liverpool. YCD Multimedia also installed a number of digital media products at Wimpy in Marlow in the UK.  In another project, Crocs worked with YCD to design their new US stores. The company deployed digital media solutions at Aroma Espresso Bar, Israel's largest café chain, which evolved into an international chain, serving over 25 million customers a year in more than 100 branches.

In 2009, YCD launched  YCD|RAMP™ - Retail Advertising and Merchandising Platform. YCD was Pizza Hut's partner in its rebranding effort that included in-store digital video network, called Hut TV. In another project, YCD Multimedia provided a digital media solution  to American Airlines’ Terminal 9 at New York’s JFK airport. In Europe, Krëfel, a home appliance chain operating in Belgium and Luxemburg, used YCD Multimedia's solutions in more than 70 branches. In Belgium, YCD's solutions were also  installed in a new concept store of Free Record Shop in Antwerp, a Benelux entertainment chain. In Israel, MANGO's concept fashion boutique in Tel-Aviv selected YCD Multimedia to provide in-store digital media solutions.

In 2010, YCD added Burger King restaurant in Times Square, NYC, to its customer base. YCD also provided digital media solutions and creative services for the newly renovated Bobbi Brown (an Estée Lauder Companies brand) flagship cosmetics counter at Bloomingdale’s 59th Street department store in New York. Ed Hardy, an international lifestyle brand, installed YCD solutions in their retail stores in Sydney and London. In Israel, YCD and Retalix provided Israel's Shufersal supermarkets network with a combined solution, integrating over 500 displays with points of sale. Another large project was the installation of YCD's video wall solution (MuviWall) in Israel's Cinema City in Rishon LeZion, a new movie and entertainment multiplex.  Arcaffe,  an Israeli chain of coffee shops, implemented YCD Multimedia's solution throughout their branches.

In 2011, YCD Multimedia acquired C-nario, a global provider of digital signage software solutions, headquartered in Israel. As a result of the integration between the two companies, YCD  expanded its reach to serve more than 2,000 brands, including Fortune 500 global brands, in over 40 countries worldwide. In the US, Perry Ellis International, a designer, manufacturer, distributor and licensor of apparel and accessories, partnered with YCD Multimedia to deploy in-store digital media experiences. In Israel,  YCD collaborated with Cellcom, Israel's largest cellular provider, in the development of  a new multimedia solution: a Multi-Touch Digital Device Catalogue Video Wall, powered by YCD|Player™. In Russia the Shokolodniza coffee chain selected YCD for digital menu boards and a music channel. In Miami, Florida, Giraffas, a Brazilian restaurant chain, opened a new restaurant and YCD was selected for a menu board. In Turkey, YCD's solution was implemented in two leading Turkish supermarket and hypermarket chains: Migros and Macrocenter.

References and notes 

17. Telecom Italia Selects YCD Multimedia’s Digital Signage Platform for Its Flagship Store at Rome’s International Airport

Software companies of Israel
Signage